= Malakabad, Swat =

Coordinates: 30°02′N 72°15′E

Malakabad
- Union Council
- ملک آباد
- Interactive map of Malakabad
- Country: Pakistan
- Province: Khyber Pakhtunkhwa
- District: Swat
- Time zone: UTC+5 (PST)

Malakabad (Urdu: ملک آباد) is an administrative unit, known as Union council, of Swat District in the Khyber Pakhtunkhwa province of Pakistan. District Swat has 9 tehsils i.e. Khwazakhela, Kabal, Madyan, Barikot, Mingora, and Kalam. Each tehsil comprises a certain number of union councils. There are 65 union councils in district Swat, 56 rural and 9 urban.

== See also ==
- Swat District
